One Island, 1 Island and similar may refer to:

 One Island East, a supertall skyscraper in Hong Kong
 One Island Lake Provincial Park, a provincial park in British Columbia, Canada
 1 Island (Houtman Abrolhos)  in the Houtman Abrolhos group, Western Australia

See also

 One Man's Island
 Two Islands
 Three Islands
 Five Islands (disambiguation)
 Seven Islands (disambiguation)
 Forty Islands
 Hundred Islands
 Thousand Islands (disambiguation)
 Ten Thousand Islands